Roth's spots, also known as Litten spots or the Litten sign, are non-specific red spots with white or pale centres, seen on the retina and although traditionally associated with infective endocarditis, can occur in a number of other conditions including hypertension, diabetes, collagen vascular disease, extreme hypoxia, leukemia and HIV.

Red and white retinal spots were first observed in 1872 by Swiss physician Moritz Roth, and named "Roth spots" six years later by Moritz Litten. They are typically observed via fundoscopy (using an ophthalmoscope to view inside the eye) or slit lamp exam.

The original retinal spots identified in 1872 were attributed to nerve-fibres that had burst. Present-day analysis shows that they can be composed of coagulated fibrin including platelets, focal ischaemia, inflammatory infiltrate, infectious organisms, or neoplastic cells.

Cause
Roth's spots occur in conditions that predispose to endothelial damage of retinal capillaries, that is when there is dysfunction and disruption of the endothelium of retinal capillaries. Looking through the microscope reveals lesions with white centers made mainly of fibrin, depicting a fibrin-platelet plug at the site of vessel damage.

Associated conditions
Conditions associated with Roth's spots include:''
 Infective endocarditis
 Anaemia/thrombocytopenia
 Collagen vascular disease
 Leukemia
 Hypertensive retinopathy
 Diabetic retinopathy
 Pre-eclampsia
 Human Immunodeficiency Virus (HIV)
 Extreme hypoxia
 Shaken-baby syndrome
and also:
 Candida albicans infection
 vascular diseases
 kala azar

Prevalence
Roth's spots occur in only 5% of people with infective endocarditis. Litten, however reported a figure of 80%.

See also
 Osler's nodes
 Janeway lesion
 Splinter haemorrhage

References

External links
 Image from the New England Journal of Medicine: Endocarditis
 Image from the New England Journal of Medicine: CML

Eye diseases
Symptoms and signs: Cardiac